Dolja may refer to:
 Dolja, Gusinje, Montenegro
 Dolja, Zrenjanin, a neighbourhood of Zrenjanin, Serbia

See also 
 Dolya (disambiguation)